D.010, aka Black Sea Coastal Road, is a major west-east state road in northern Turkey that serves the Black Sea coast. The gap of  distance is on the highway D.750.

Connecting most of the coastal towns and cities at middle and eastern Black Sea, D.010 runs through Ereğli, Zonguldak, Bartın, Sinop, Samsun, Ordu, Giresun, Trabzon and Rize. It leaves the coast at Hopa, Artvin Province and turns southeast. D.010 passes through Ardahan and connects at Akçakale, Kars Province to D.060, which leads in the east to the border checkpoint Turkey-Armenia at Akyaka, Kars. On its full length, it passes through 14 provinces of Turkey.

Itinerary
In the table below the locations between Karasu and Sarp are shown.

{| class="wikitable"
!Province
!City/Town
!Distance fromprevious location 
!Distance fromWest end
!Distance fromEast end
|-
|Sakarya
|Intersection Karasu ||0 ||0 ||1,427
|-
|Düzce
|Akçakoca ||31 ||31 ||1,396
|-
|rowspan=7 |Zonguldak
|Alaplı ||27 ||58 ||1,369
|-
|Ereğli ||12 ||70 ||1,357
|-
|Kozlu ||41 ||111 ||1,316
|-
|Zonguldak ||5 ||116 ||1,311
|-116
|Intersection Zonguldak ||0 ||116 ||1,311
|-
|Intersection Bakacakadı ||0 ||116 ||1,311
|-
|Çaycuma ||10 ||126 ||1,301
|-
|rowspan=3 |Bartın
|Bartın ||41 ||167 ||1,260
|-
|Amasra ||17 ||184 ||1,243
|-
|Kurucaşile ||45 ||229 ||1,198
|-
|rowspan=5 |Kastamonu
|Cide ||28 ||257 ||1,170
|-
|Doğanyurt ||69 ||326 ||1,101
|-
|İnebolu ||32 ||358 ||1,069
|-
|Abana ||22 ||380 ||1,047
|-
|Çatalzeytin ||22 ||402 ||1,025
|-
|rowspan=4 |Sinop
|Türkeli ||10 ||412 ||1,015
|-
|Ayancık ||30 ||442 ||985
|-
|Sinop ||59 ||501 ||926
|-
|Gerze ||33 ||534 ||893
|-
|rowspan=5 |Samsun
|Yakakent ||44 ||578 ||849
|-
|Bafra ||31 ||609 ||818
|-
|Samsun ||50 ||659 ||768
|-
|Çarşamba ||39 ||698 ||729
|-
|Terme ||21 ||719 ||708
|-
|rowspan=4 |Ordu
|Ünye ||30 ||749 ||678
|-
|Fatsa ||22 ||771 ||656
|-
|Ordu ||41 ||812 ||615
|-
|Gülyalı ||14 ||826 ||601
|-
|rowspan=8 |Giresun
|Piraziz ||5 ||831 ||596
|-
|Bulancak ||15 ||846 ||581
|-
|Giresun ||21 ||867 ||560
|-
|Keşap ||7 ||874 ||553
|-
|Espiye ||20 ||894 ||533
|-
|Tirebolu ||12 ||906 ||521
|-
|Görele ||16 ||922 ||505
|-
|Eynesil ||13 ||935 ||492
|-
|rowspan=10 |Trabzon
|Beşikdüzü ||4 ||939 ||488
|-
|Vakfıkebir ||4 ||943 ||484
|-
|Çarşıbaşı ||9 ||952 ||475
|-
|Akçaabat ||22 ||974 ||453
|-
|Trabzon ||8 ||982 ||445
|-
|Yomra ||5 ||987 ||440
|-
|Arsin ||6 ||993 ||434
|-
|Araklı ||12 ||1,005 ||422
|-
|Sürmene ||7 ||1,012 ||415
|-
|Of ||14 ||1,026 ||401
|-
|rowspan=6 |Rize
|İyidere ||8 ||1,034 ||393
|-
|Derepazarı ||6 ||1,040 ||387
|-
|Rize ||13 ||1,053 ||374
|-
|Çayeli ||19 ||1,072 ||355
|-
|Pazar ||15 ||1,087 ||340
|-
|Ardeşen ||9 ||1,096 ||331
|-
|rowspan=5 |Artvin
|Fındıklı ||16 ||1,112 ||315
|-
|Arhavi ||16 ||1,128 ||299
|-
|Hopa ||11 ||1,139 ||288
|-
|Borçka ||36 ||1,175 ||252
|-
|Şavşat ||95 ||1,270 ||157
|-
|rowspan=2 |Ardahan
|Ardahan ||49 ||1,319 ||108
|-
|Çıldır ||44 ||1,363 ||64
|-
|rowspan=2 |Kars
|Arpaçay ||53 ||1,416 ||11
|-
|Intersection Akçakale ||11 ||1,427 ||0

Intersections

See also
Selimiye Tunnel between Hopa and Kemalpaşa in Artvin Province.

References

010
Transport in Sakarya Province
Transport in Düzce Province
Transport in Zonguldak Province
Transport in Bartın Province
Transport in Kastamonu Province
Transport in Sinop Province
Transport in Samsun Province
Transport in Ordu Province
Transport in Giresun Province
Transport in Trabzon Province
Transport in Rize Province
Transport in Artvin Province
Transport in Ardahan Province
Transport in Kars Province